This is a non-exhaustive list of films that have been or are banned in Canada.

List

See also
 List of banned films
 Cinema of Canada
 Film censorship

References

Banned
Canada

 List Canada